Thomas Chirault (born 15 September 1997) is a French archer competing in men's recurve events. He won the silver medal in the men's team event at the 2017 World Archery Championships held in Mexico City, Mexico.

At the 2018 European Archery Championships in Legnica, Poland, he won the silver medal in the mixed team recurve event.

In 2021, he represented France at the 2020 Summer Olympics in Tokyo, Japan.

He won the gold medal in the men's team recurve event at the 2022 European Indoor Archery Championships held in Laško, Slovenia.

References

External links 
 

Living people
1997 births
Place of birth missing (living people)
French male archers
European Games medalists in archery
European Games gold medalists for France
Archers at the 2019 European Games
World Archery Championships medalists
Olympic archers of France
Archers at the 2020 Summer Olympics
21st-century French people